David Gilbert may refer to:

Politics
 David Gilbert (activist) (born 1944), American radical leftist organizer and convicted felon
 Dave Gilbert (politician) (1935–2019), politician in Newfoundland, Canada
 Tony Gilbert (activist) (David Gilbert, 1914–1992), British political activist

Sports
 David Gilbert (cricketer, born 1827) (1827–?), English cricketer
 Dave Gilbert (cricketer) (born 1960), former Australian cricketer
 Dave Gilbert (footballer) (born 1963), English former footballer
 Dave Gilbert (snooker player, born 1961) (born 1961), English snooker player
 David Gilbert (snooker player) (born 1981), English snooker player

Other
 David Gilbert (author) (born 1967), American novelist
 Dave Gilbert (game designer) (born 1976), designer of adventure games
 David M. Gilbert, American biologist
 Dave Gilbert, singer with The Rockets (Detroit band)